Events in the year 1866 in Peru.

Incumbents
President: Mariano Ignacio Prado

Events
May 2 - Chincha Islands War: Battle of Callao

Births
 September 8: Amalia Puga de Losada, writer.

Deaths

 
1860s in Peru